TFCA may refer to:
Transfrontier conservation area, a protected area that spans across boundaries of multiple countries or country subdivisions, where the political border sections that are enclosed within its area are abolished
Toronto Film Critics Association, an organization of film reviewers from Toronto-based publications
Toronto FC Academy, the academy team of Toronto FC that currently competes in League1 Ontario